The Caripunás River is a river of Rondônia state in western Brazil.

See also
List of rivers of Rondônia

References
Brazilian Ministry of Transport

Rivers of Rondônia